Dr Ibrahim Helmi Abd-elRahman was born in the village of Kafr Alwlga of the Center for Kafr shokr Qaliubiya in the Arab Republic of Egypt, he died in 1998 . His father al-Sheikh / Abd ElRahman Helba was the mayor of the village Kafr Alwlga.

Established the Ministry of National Planning and Follow-up in Egypt. The Egyptian Minister of Planning and former under President Anwar Sadat , a scientist in the planning , astronomy and economics and a professor in the translation.

He was the first executive head of the United Nations Industrial Development Organization (UNIDO) 1966–1974 .

References

1998 deaths
United Nations Industrial Development Organization people
Planning ministers of Egypt